Donje Sinkovce (Serbian Cyrillic: Доње Синковце) is a town in Serbia. According to the 2002 census, the town has a population of 1661 people.

Located on the edge of an old landslide. In the middle of 20th century, Donja Sinkovce was 3 kilometers away from Leskovac. Now Leskovac has expanded to Donje Sinkovce, so they have merged into one settlement. None of the settlement near Leskovac has grown into such a prominent settlement, as Donje Sinkovce.

History 

The name Donje Sinkovce is, as in the case of Gornje Sinkovce, homonymous and composed of the old Serbian name of the son. The place where the first Sebar Sina settled and the settlement was named after him, or was named Sinkovce. Old Sinkovce, too, is an old Serbian village that originated in a Serbian medieval state. The Turks refer to it in their tefter of 1516 as Dolnje Sipkovce. The present residents are mostly settled.

Geography 
The settlement is located at the foot of Hisar Hill. The area of Donje Sinkovce, extends to 255 hectares, of which the fields and gardens cover an area of 173 hectares. The rest belongs to other crops and barren land. Names of these lands are: Lozja, Čukar, Sukin Vis, Nikolino Dolinče, Cemetery, Rovina, Kotlina, Govedarnik, Tirino or Marjanovo Lozje, Kovanluk, Krnjine Njive, Petno Bresje, Jankov Bres, Studenke, Stara Konopljiste, Idjok Njiva, Pojata, Đutin Bres, Mičine Njive, Prekodrum Jasice, Church Road, Golem Njiva, Mircanka, Babičanka, Golemi Lug, Trnjaci and Medubarke.

The settlement is located on Golema Bara canal. On the eastern periphery of the settlement, Golema Bara water was caught in a recently dug canal, which drains the ponds and surface waters flowing from the river Jablanica.

Army group  

The third training army center is located in Donje Sinkovce. The name of barracks is named in the honor of Vojvoda Petar Bojović. The mission of the Third Training Center is to improve the ability to perform individual training to meet the standards of individual training, and to improve the conditions for growing and developing the operational capabilities of war units. The barracks were bombed in the war 1999, in  NATO bombing of Yugoslavia.

References

Populated places in Jablanica District